In mathematics, the Khatri–Rao product of matrices defined as

in which the ij-th block is the  sized Kronecker product of the corresponding blocks of A and B, assuming the number of row and column partitions of both matrices is equal.  The size of the product is then .

For example, if A and B both are  partitioned matrices e.g.:

we obtain:

This is a submatrix of the Tracy–Singh product

of the two matrices (each partition in this example is a partition in a corner of the Tracy–Singh product) and also may be called the block Kronecker product.

Column-wise Kronecker product 

A column-wise Kronecker product of two matrices may also be called the Khatri–Rao product. This product assumes the partitions of the matrices are their columns. The resulting product is a  matrix of which each column is the Kronecker product of the corresponding columns of A and B.  Using the matrices from the previous examples with the columns partitioned:

so that:

This column-wise version of the Khatri–Rao product is useful in linear algebra approaches to data analytical processing and in optimizing the solution of inverse problems dealing with a diagonal matrix.

In 1996 the Column-wise Khatri–Rao product was proposed to estimate the angles of arrival (AOAs) and delays of multipath signals and four coordinates of signals sources at a digital antenna array.

Face-splitting product 

The alternative concept of the matrix product, which uses row-wise splitting of matrices with a given quantity of rows, was proposed by V. Slyusar in 1996.
 
This matrix operation was named the "face-splitting product" of matrices or the "transposed Khatri–Rao product". This type of operation is based on row-by-row Kronecker products of two matrices. Using the matrices from the previous examples with the rows partitioned:

the result can be obtained:

Main properties

Examples

Theorem
If , where  are independent components a random matrix  with independent identically distributed rows , such that

then for any vector 
 

with probability  if the quantity of rows

 

which matches the Johnson–Lindenstrauss lemma of  when  is small.

Block face-splitting product 

According to the definition of V. Slyusar the block face-splitting product of two partitioned matrices with a given quantity of rows in blocks

can be written as :

The transposed block face-splitting product (or Block column-wise version of the Khatri–Rao product) of two partitioned matrices with a given quantity of columns in blocks has a view:

Main properties
Transpose:

Applications 
The Face-splitting product and the Block Face-splitting product used in the tensor-matrix theory of digital antenna arrays. These operations used also in:
 Artificial Intelligence and Machine learning systems to minimization of convolution and tensor sketch operations,
 A popular Natural Language Processing models, and hypergraph models of similarity,
 Generalized linear array model in statistics
 Two- and multidimensional P-spline approximation of data,
 Studies of genotype x environment interactions.

See also 
 Kronecker product
 Hadamard product

Notes

References 
 
 
 
 

Matrix theory